Berne is a river of Lower Saxony, Germany. It flows into the Ollen in the village Berne.

See also
List of rivers of Lower Saxony

Rivers of Lower Saxony
Rivers of Germany